Broadway Bound is a 1992 American made-for-television comedy film directed by Paul Bogart, written by Neil Simon, and starring Corey Parker and Jonathan Silverman. Simon adapted his semi-autobiographical 1986 play Broadway Bound, the third chapter in what is known as the Eugene trilogy, the first being Brighton Beach Memoirs and the second being Biloxi Blues. Silverman, who played Eugene Jerome in the original stage version of Broadway Bound and in the film adaptation of Brighton Beach Memoirs, plays Eugene's older brother Stanley in the film. Parker played Pvt. Arnold Epstein in the film adaptation of Biloxi Blues.

Synopsis
The film is about Eugene and his older brother, Stanley, dealing with their parents' relationship falling apart as the brothers work together toward being comedy writers for the radio, and, eventually, television.

Cast
 Corey Parker as Eugene Morris Jerome
 Jonathan Silverman as Stanley Jerome
 Anne Bancroft as Kate Jerome
 Hume Cronyn as Ben
 Jerry Orbach as Jack Jerome
 Michele Lee as Blanche

Reception
Cronyn won a 1992 Primetime Emmy Award for Outstanding Supporting Actor in a Miniseries or a Movie for his role in the film.

References

External links
 

1992 television films
1992 films
American comedy television films
1992 comedy films
Films about Jews and Judaism
American films based on plays
Films set in the 1950s
Films set in Mississippi
Films directed by Paul Bogart
Films scored by David Shire
Films with screenplays by Neil Simon
Films based on works by Neil Simon
ABC Motion Pictures films
1990s English-language films
1990s American films